Kochi Water Metro is an integrated ferry transport project in Greater Kochi region proposed by Kochi Metro Rail Limited. It is the first of its kind transport system in India and South Asia, that will connect Kochi’s 10 island communities with the mainland through a fleet of 78 battery-operated electric hybrid boats plying along 38 terminals and 16 routes spanning 76 kilometers. It also serves as a feeder service to suburbs along the rivers where transport accesibility is limited. The project obtained the final environment clearance in October 2019 and its first route between Vytilla and InfoPark was inaugurated in February 2021. As of December 2022, it is expected to be in operation by the early 2023. The project is expected to become fully operational by 2035 with a daily readership of 1.5 lakh passengers.

Overview
Two variants of modernised air-conditioned and Wi-Fi enabled catamaran passenger boats were proposed for the project. The electric propulsion boats has a passenger capacity of 50 and 100 operate at an optimal speed of about 15 kilometers per hour, with the potential to increase up to 22 kilometers per hour. The boats are equipped with latest safety and communication devices. Small battery operated boats ply on the narrow lanes. The headways vary between 10 minutes to 20 minutes across various routes. The jetties are proposed to have floating pontoons with automatic docking system technology. The floating pontoons is covered with retractable sheds to provide comfort during rainy season.

As part of the infrastructure, Intelligent Navigation System and Operation Control Centre (OCC) are also proposed and will be integrated with the city’s intelligent transportation system. The Automatic Fare Collection system being implemented by the Kochi Metro will be extended to water transport system which facilitates travelling the metro train and the boat using the same ticket.

Apart from ferry service, the project also contemplate development of the new and existing access roads to jetties and islands. Two boatyards are proposed, at Thevara and Pizhala. The project also seeks to improve livelihoods in the areas along the backwaters and the islands in Kochi. Tourism is also proposed to be promoted as part of the project. Cochin Shipyard delivered the first of 23 electric ferries in January 2022.

The phase 1 consists of 3 lines out of which the Vytilla-InfoPark was inaugurated on 15 February 2021. Phase 1 is expected to be fully operational in 2024 and on becoming so, it is expected to serve 34,000 passengers a day. The entire water metro system is expected to become fully operational by 2035 with a daily ridership of 1.5 lakh passengers.

Routes and jetties

Kochi is mostly surrounded by backwaters and bordered by the Arabian Sea. It is interconnected by hundreds of waterways, which offers a way to make the public transport system much more accessible and environment friendly. Water Metro is expected to solve the travel issues of the islanders of Willington, Kumbalam  Vypeen, Edakochi, Nettoor, Vyttila, Eloor, Kakkanad, and Mulavukad.

Funding

The KfW Development Bank will be providing EUR 85 million as long term soft loan and the  Government of Kerala will be contributing .

International attention
In November 2022, the International Maritime Organisation officials visited Kochi as a part of their Green Voyage 2050 project and praised Kochi Water Metro project for its unique initiatives. "The purpose of our visit is to learn about the impressive achievement of Kerala in terms of the water metro, a pioneering initiative in sustainable urban water transport and show others across the world that it is possible to have commercial viability, environmental sustainability and societal impact through such services. We hope that the water metro service will be extended to other parts of the state as well”; said IMO department of partnership and projects chief Jose Mathieckal.

Gallery

References

Ferry transport in India
Transport in Kochi